Bureau may refer to:

Agencies and organizations
Government agency
Public administration
 News bureau, an office for gathering or distributing news, generally for a given geographical location
 Bureau (European Parliament), the administrative organ of the Parliament of the European Union
 Federal Bureau of Investigation, the leading internal law enforcement agency in the United States
 Service bureau, a company which provides business services for a fee
 Citizens Advice Bureau, a network of independent UK charities that give free, confidential help to people for money, legal, consumer and other problems

Furniture
 Bureau is a piece of furniture with hinged writing space of flap resting at an angle when closed
 Bureau bedstead is form of a folding bed that looks like a bureau when closed
 Bureau bookcase is a combination of a bureau and a bookcase.
 Bureau cabinet is a combination of a bureau and display shelves.
 Bureau dressing table is a combination of a dressing table and a writing desk. Later models by Chippendale lost the actual bureau. 
 Bureau table is a variant of a kneehole desk with drawers. 
 Chest of drawers, a piece of furniture that has multiple, stacked, parallel drawers

Geography 
 Bureau County, Illinois
 Bureau Lake, a body of water in the Gouin Reservoir, in Quebec, Canada

People 

 Bernard Béréau (1940–2005), French footballer
 Bernard Bureau (born 1959), French footballer

Other uses
 The Bureau (band), English New Wave soul music group
 The Bureau (TV series),  original title: , a French political thriller series
 Le Bureau, a 2006 French adaptation of the British television series The Office
 The Bureau: XCOM Declassified, a 2013 tactical shooter video game
 Bureau (surname)

See also
Bureaucracy
Borrow (disambiguation)
Borough
Burrow